The Standing Stone is an adventure module for the 3rd edition of the Dungeons & Dragons fantasy role-playing game.

Plot summary
In The Standing Stone, a tiefling sorcerer named Dyson discovers a circle of standing stones constructed centuries ago by druids to hold their annual rituals; the druid community was later destroyed by the great dragon Ashardalon. Dyson uses the magic of the stones to replace people with animals transformed into humanoid form, loyal to him. Dyson encounters the player characters in the village of Ossington and tries to manipulate them into eliminating the remaining enemies standing in his way.

Publication history
The Standing Stone was published in 2001, and was written by John D. Rateliff, with cover art by Jeff Easley and interior art by Dennis Cramer.

Reception

References

Dungeons & Dragons modules
Role-playing game supplements introduced in 2001